XHEOB-FM is a radio station on 91.3 FM in Pichucalco, Chiapas, Mexico.

History
XEOB-AM received its concession in 1942 and operated on 670 kHz. It was owned by Francisco Marmolejo Beltrán. It was approved for AM-FM migration in 2010.

Around 2014, XEOB began targeting the Villahermosa radio market with Grupo Siete's grupera format. That agreement ended in 2018 with the station returning to full Radio Núcleo operation.

References

Radio stations in Chiapas